German Politics and Society (GP&S) is a peer-reviewed academic journal published by Berghahn edited by Jeffrey J. Anderson. It explores issues in modern Germany from the conjointed perspectives of the social sciences, history, and cultural studies, and provides a forum for critical analysis and debate about politics, history, film, literature, visual arts, and popular culture. Every issue presents contributions by scholars commenting on recent books about Germany.

Indexing 

German Politics & Society is indexed/abstracted in:

External links 
German Politics and Society website

English-language journals
Political science journals
Quarterly journals
Berghahn Books academic journals